The Col. Elijah Sterling Clack Robertson Plantation is a Southern plantation with a historic house located in Salado, Texas, USA. The National Register of Historic Places has listed it since April 5, 1983. Robertson built the house in the late 1850s, completing the construction of the main house in 1960. Robertson obtained the mansion's metal roof from Houston and used local limestone to build the kitchen, the stable, and quarters for the people he enslaved. In 1936, the Historic American Buildings Survey listed the plantation, which received a Texas Centennial Marker. In 1967, the plantation became a Texas Historic Landmark.

See also

National Register of Historic Places listings in Bell County, Texas
Recorded Texas Historic Landmarks in Bell County

References

External links

Plantation houses in Texas
Houses in Bell County, Texas
Houses on the National Register of Historic Places in Texas
National Register of Historic Places in Bell County, Texas
Recorded Texas Historic Landmarks